"Downtown" is the third single from electropop band Kids of 88 off their debut album Sugarpills. This song was released digitally through the New Zealand iTunes Store on 19 July 2010.

History
The single received much airplay on New Zealand radio station The Edge. The song was released digitally on 19 July 2010.

Music video
The music video premiered on C4, Monday 2 August 2010. It features Kids of 88 in front of a green screen with many different background and effects.

Charts

References

2010 singles
Kids of 88 songs
Songs written by Joel Little
2010 songs
Songs written by Sam McCarthy